The Eastern Crown is a gold heraldic crown surmounted with a variable number of sharp spikes. It is so called because of its origin in the Eastern Mediterranean. The Eastern Crown is one of the oldest crowns, and so for this reason it has also been known as the Antique Crown.

The celestial crown is a modified Eastern Crown with longer spikes and topped by stars with no specific fixed number of points.

Gallery

See also
Radiant crown
Crown (heraldry)
Celestial crown
Heraldry
Circlet
Golden hat

References

 Eastern Crown definition. Libro de Armoría.
Heraldic crowns, www.scottish-wedding-dreams.com
Fox-Davies, Arthur Charles (1909) A Complete Guide to Heraldry, Chapter XXIII: Crest, Coronets and Chapeaux.

Eastern
Crowns in heraldry

Crowns of the coat of Arms of Austria-Hungary